This is the list of appointed members to the members of the European Parliament for Slovakia from 1 May 2004 until the first direct election on 13 June 2004.

List 

2004
Slovakia